Edward Miller, FBA (16 July 1915 – 21 December 2000) was an eminent British historian. He was educated at Cambridge University where he read medieval history. After a successful career in academia and public life, he was elected to become the Master of Fitzwilliam College, Cambridge for over a decade, between the years 1971 and 1981. During this time, Miller oversaw a significant expansion of the college and was constantly active in the governance of the University of Cambridge.

Life
He was born at Acklington Park, the son of a shepherd. He attended King Edward VI Grammar School in Morpeth and went on to excel at St John's College, Cambridge, specialising in medieval history. Having grown up on a farm, he was drawn to questions of medieval agriculture and the peasants whose labour had sustained the clergy.

After a professorship at the University of Sheffield he returned to his alma mater, Cambridge University, where he was elected to high office as the Master of Fitzwilliam College (1971–81). At Cambridge he also chaired the Victoria County History committee and the History of Parliament Trust.

Works
With John Hatcher, he wrote Medieval England: Rural Society and Economic Change, 1086–1348 (1978), which soon became a standard work for students. A companion volume by the same authors, Medieval England: Towns, Commerce and Crafts, 1086–1348 appeared in 1995.

Miller was co-editor of the second edition of volume 2 (1987) of the Cambridge Economic History of Europe, and editor of the third volume (1991) of the Agrarian History of England and Wales, covering the period from 1348 to 1500.

Sources
Author and Bookinfo.com

See also
University of Cambridge
University of Oxford
England
Normandy

1915 births
2000 deaths
Alumni of St John's College, Cambridge
Masters of Fitzwilliam College, Cambridge
20th-century English historians
Contributors to the Victoria County History
Fellows of the British Academy